Lepse Electric Machine-Building Plant is a company based in Kirov, Russia and established in 1941. It is part of Uralvagonzavod.

The Lepse Electric Machine-Building Plant produces a wide range of electrical components for aircraft, as well as consumer goods.

References

External links
 Official website

Manufacturing companies of Russia
Companies based in Kirov Oblast
Uralvagonzavod
Ministry of the Aviation Industry (Soviet Union)
Aircraft component manufacturers of the Soviet Union